The 1985–86 Bradley Braves men's basketball team represented Bradley University during the 1985–86 NCAA Division I men's basketball season. The Braves were members of the Missouri Valley Conference and played their home games at Carver Arena. The team rode a 22–game winning streak on their way to a new school record for wins by finishing the season at 32–3. After sweeping through MVC regular season play with a 16–0 league mark – finishing ahead of the pack by a 6-game margin – Bradley lost in the championship game of the MVC tournament. The Braves earned an at-large bid to the NCAA tournament as No. 7 seed in the West region. The Braves defeated UTEP to open the tournament, but fell to Louisville, the eventual national champions, in the second round.

Roster

Schedule

|-
!colspan=9 style=| Regular season

|-
!colspan=12 style=| MVC Tournament

|-
!colspan=12 style=| NCAA Tournament

Source:

Rankings

Awards and honors
Jim Les – Frances Pomeroy Naismith Award, MVC Player of the Year
Dick Versace – Henry Iba Award, MVC Coach of the Year

Team players in the 1986 NBA Draft

References

Bradley Braves men's basketball seasons
Bradley
Bradley
Bradley Braves men's basketball
Bradley Braves men's basketball